The 1974–75 Iowa Hawkeyes men's basketball team represented the University of Iowa as members of the Big Ten Conference. The team was led by first-year head coach Lute Olson, and played their home games at the Iowa Field House. They finished the season 10–16 overall and 7–11 in Big Ten play.

Roster

Schedule/results

|-
!colspan=8| Non-Conference Regular Season
|-

|-
!colspan=8| Big Ten Conference Season
|-

References

Iowa
Iowa Hawkeyes men's basketball seasons
Hawkeyes
Hawkeyes